Synchrony Financial is a consumer financial services company headquartered in Stamford, Connecticut, United States.  The company offers consumer financing products, including credit, promotional financing and loyalty programs, installment lending to industries, and FDIC-insured consumer savings products through Synchrony Bank, its wholly owned online bank subsidiary.

History 
Synchrony traces its roots to 1932. GE Capital Retail Bank was started during the Great Depression, providing customers a line of credit to purchase GE appliances. The lending arm remained GE Capital Retail Bank until being spun off from its parent company in June 2014. GE filed with the Securities and Exchange Commission on March 13, 2014, announcing its intention to spin-off the portion of its GE Capital business dedicated to retail credit cards. GE's SEC filing indicated that the new company would be called Synchrony Financial.  On July 31, 2014, Synchrony Financial raised $2.88 billion in its initial public offering.

Recent corporate history 
In 2017, Synchrony acquired GP Shopper.

In 2018, Synchrony acquired Loop Commerce, which provides a patented digital gifting platform called GiftNow. In 2018, Synchrony's largest program was the acquisition of PayPal's $7.6 billion credit receivables portfolio.  PayPal also chose Synchrony Bank to be its exclusive issuer for the PayPal Credit point of sale financing program in the United States through 2028. Additionally, PayPal agreed to extend its existing co-brand credit card relationship with Synchrony through the same 10-year term. These transactions (collectively, the "PayPal transaction") officially closed in July 2018.

In 2019, Synchrony announced the acquisition of Pets Best, which offers pet insurance and wellness plans for dogs and cats. Pets Best will operate under Synchrony's CareCredit platform.

GIC Private Limited, the sovereign wealth fund of Singapore, owns 7.72% of Synchrony's stock.

Products and technology 
Synchrony is the largest provider of private label credit cards in the U.S.  Brands partnered with Synchrony include Amazon, Lowe's, Guitar Center, Gap,  Cathay Pacific, Rakuten, Verizon, Sleep Number, Walgreens, and Sam's Club.

In 2019, Synchrony expanded its auto and home acceptance locations and value propositions. Synchrony partnered with Discover Financial, and launched the Synchrony HOME Credit Card, which can be used by consumers to finance their home needs at more than a million retail locations nationwide. Synchrony also increased its Car Care acceptance network to more than 500,000 locations across 25 categories including gas, auto parts and service, car washes, parking, and ride sharing.

Synchrony has four "Innovation Stations," which are located in Stamford, Connecticut; Chicago, Illinois; Kettering, Ohio; and Hyderabad, India.

Synchrony's corporate ventures arm, Synchrony Ventures, invests in early-stage companies that provide emerging technology and products.

In 2016, Synchrony Financial launched Digital Apply, a credit application site, and SyPI (Synchrony plug-in), a feature for retailers' mobile apps, through which customers can access their credit card information. As of 2019, more than 20 retailers had adopted SyPI and nearly $2 billion in credit card payments had been made through the technology.

In 2018, Synchrony created the Alexa Store Card skill for customers to manage their Amazon Store Cards via voice technology.

A majority of Synchrony's retail partners have deployed Synchrony's AI-enabled virtual assistant Sydney for cardholders.

Public-private partnerships 
In 2016, the University of Connecticut's School of Engineering announced the launch of Synchrony's Center of Excellence in Cybersecurity.

In 2018, Synchrony opened an emerging tech center at the University of Illinois.

In 2019, Synchrony opened the Synchrony Digital Technology Center at the University of Connecticut's Stamford campus. During the dedication of the Center, the company announced a $1 million donation to the "Connecticut Commitment" – an initiative aimed at helping lower-income Connecticut students attend the University, tuition-free.

Settlements 
In June 2014, shortly before Synchrony's New York Stock Exchange debut, the U.S. Consumer Financial Protection Bureau and the Department of Justice reached a $225 million settlement with the company after it entered into a consent decree with the Consumer Financial Protection Bureau. The settlement stated that while operating as GE Capital Bank, the company had engaged in deceptive and discriminatory credit card practices, primarily surrounding nefarious enrollment practices for add-on programs such as financial hardship relief.  According to USA Today, "The bank said it discontinued such sales practices in 2012 and has already refunded more than $11 million in fees as a result of its own review," however the CFPB ordered many millions more in redress, and consumer complaints to the Bureau about these practices continue to the present day.

References

External links 
 

American companies established in 2003
Financial services companies established in 2003
Credit cards in the United States
Companies based in Stamford, Connecticut
Companies listed on the New York Stock Exchange
Financial services companies of the United States
2014 initial public offerings